There are 276 Pradeshiya Sabhas in Sri Lanka, which are the legislative bodies that preside over the third tier municipalities in the country. Introduced in 1987 through the 13th Amendment to the Constitution of Sri Lanka, Pradeshiya Sabhas became a devolved subject under the Provincial Councils in the Local Government system of Sri Lanka. The Pradeshiya Sabhas collectively govern approximately 16,726,000 people. There are 3,624 Councillors in total, ranging from 5 to 23 per council.

Pradeshiya Sabhas

Western Province

North Western Province

Central Province

Uva

Southern Province

Sabaragamuwa

North Central Province

Northern Province

Eastern Province

Former
Renamed in 2017
 Thamankaduwa Pradeshiya Sabha renamed Polonnaruwa Pradeshiya Sabha.

Notes

See also
Provincial government in Sri Lanka
Local government in Sri Lanka
Municipal councils of Sri Lanka
Urban councils of Sri Lanka

References

External links
 Ministry of Local Government & Provincial Councils

Populated places in Sri Lanka
Lists of municipalities
Sri Lanka geography-related lists